Joseph Nocera (born May 6, 1952) is an American business journalist, and author. He has written for The New York Times since April 2005, writing for the Op-Ed page from 2011 to 2015. He was also an opinion columnist for Bloomberg Opinion.

Early life and education
Nocera was born  in Providence, Rhode Island. He earned a B.S. in journalism from Boston University in 1974.

Career
In the late 1970s he was an editor at The Washington Monthly. In the 1980s, he was an editor at Newsweek; an executive editor of New England Monthly; and a senior editor at Texas Monthly.

Nocera was the "Profit Motive" columnist at Esquire from 1988 to 1990 and wrote the same column for GQ from 1990 to 1995. He worked at Fortune from 1995 to 2005, in a variety of positions, finally as editorial director.

He became a business columnist for The New York Times in April 2005. In March 2011, Nocera became a regular opinion columnist for The Times'''s Op-Ed page, writing on Tuesdays and Saturdays. He is also a business commentator for NPR’s Weekend Edition with Scott Simon.

In November 2015, Nocera began writing in the sports page of The Times. Executives at The Times cited Nocera's interest in sports, specifically injuries to student athletes and business issues in college athletics, as the reason for reassignment to the sports page from the Op-Ed page. In his last column on the Op-Ed page of The Times, Nocera offered his views on several issues unrelated to sports including gun control and Michael Bloomberg's involvement with the issue, Supreme Court terms, education in the United States, e-cigarettes, and election day in the United States.

In January 2017, Nocera began writing a column for Bloomberg View on business, political and other subjects.

Nocera wrote and hosted a podcast entitled The Shrink Next Door in 2019–2021. The podcast is a case study on the abuse by a psychotherapist towards a patient.

He lives in New York City.

 Interest areas 
Nocera's columns in the New York Times offer perspectives on a wide array of current events. He writes series of columns on specific issues, and often focuses on specific areas of interest to him.

 Criticism of the National Collegiate Athletic Association 
Since 2011, Nocera has written over 10 columns on the role played by the NCAA in the United States with a view that the NCAA "unfairly exploits college football and men's basketball players" through a "double standard". To support this view, he cites the negative effects NCAA policies may have on student athletes, which include unfair suspensions and financial inducements given to universities that lead to potential conflicts of interest.

Nocera has criticized specific actions and policies, pertaining to intercollegiate athletics, of many universities, including Rutgers University, University of North Carolina at Chapel Hill, University of Alabama, Baylor University, and University of Notre Dame. He has also extensively criticized the NCAA and Penn State University for their handling of the Penn State child sex abuse scandal.

Support for fracking and Keystone XL
Nocera advocates fracking, which is  viewed as an economical method for natural gas extraction.  Fracking, however, faces widespread debate for  its environmental impact. Its critics argue that, by augmenting fossil fuel supply, fracking contributes to greenhouse gas emissions and global warming. Nocera believes that these concerns are overstated because fossil fuel consumption is driven primarily by demand. Nocera argues that, because fracking has been widely adopted, "the responsible approach is not to wish it away, but to exploit its benefits while straightforwardly addressing its problems".

Nocera also supports the construction of Keystone XL, which would transport fossil fuels from oil sands and shale gas deposits in Canada. For reasons similar to those for fracking, the proposed pipeline has been subject of political debate since it was proposed in 2008. He has been a "longtime supporter of the pipeline" as it would, in his view, help the United States achieve "energy independence".

 Criticism 
In an August 2011 column on the US debt ceiling crisis, Nocera compared "Tea Party Republicans" with terrorists, and wrote that they "have waged jihad on the American people" and suggested that they "can put aside their suicide vests". This choice of words was criticized in a number of media outlets, including by Jonah Goldberg of the National Review, Jennifer Rubin of The Washington Post, and Jason Suderman of  Reason magazine, along with then White House press secretary Jay Carney. In a follow-up column, Nocera writes "[what] most surprised me is how darned liberal I sound sometimes."  He then apologized:The words I chose were intemperate and offensive to many, and I've been roundly criticized. I was a hypocrite, the critics said, for using such language when on other occasions I've called for a more civil politics. In the cool light of day, I agree with them. I apologize.After comparing Congressional negotiations with "hand-to-hand combat", Nocera concluded the column with "I won't be calling anybody names. That I can promise."

 Recognition 
Nocera's book A Piece of the Action: How the Middle Class Joined the Money Class won the New York Public Library's Helen Bernstein Award for best non-fiction book of 1995. His contributions to business journalism have been recognized with three Gerald Loeb Awards: 1983 in the Magazines category for "It's Time to Make a Deal", 1996 in the Magazines category for "Fatal Litigation", and 2008 in the Commentary category for "Talking Business". He also earned three John Hancock Awards for Excellence in Business Writing in 1983, 1984, and 1991, respectively. In 2007, he was named a Pulitzer Prize for Commentary finalist. Indentured: The Inside Story of the Rebellion Against the NCAA'', which he co-wrote with Ben Strauss, won the 2017 PEN America ESPN Award for Literary Sportswriting.

Bibliography 
 
 
 
Nocera's Op-Ed columns at the New York Times are available at Nocera – Op-Ed Columns.

See also
 New Yorkers in journalism

References

External links

 
 
 

1952 births
Living people
Boston University College of Communication alumni
American business writers
American columnists
American economics writers
American male journalists
American magazine editors
The New York Times columnists
Writers from Providence, Rhode Island
Gerald Loeb Award winners for Magazines
Gerald Loeb Award winners for Columns, Commentary, and Editorials